The tornado outbreak of April 1945 occurred on April 12, 1945, in the Midwestern United States, producing numerous strong tornadoes and killing at least 118 people; however, the concurrent death of President Franklin D. Roosevelt overshadowed news of the outbreak.

Confirmed tornadoes

April 12 event

See also
1999 Oklahoma tornado outbreak – Produced a violent F5 tornado over southern portions of Oklahoma City
List of North American tornadoes and tornado outbreaks
Tornado outbreak of May 18–21, 2013 – Generated an EF5 tornado in the same area as the 1999 event
Tornado outbreak sequence of May 2003 – Spawned an F4 tornado that hit Tinker Air Force Base

Notes

References

Tornadoes of 1945
J
1945 natural disasters in the United States
Tornadoes in Arkansas
Tornadoes in Illinois
Tornadoes in Oklahoma
April 1945 events in the United States